Mortal Passions is a 1990 American crime film directed by Andrew Lane and written by Alan Moskowitz. The film stars Zach Galligan, Michael Bowen, Krista Errickson, Luca Bercovici, Sheila Kelley and David Warner. The film was released on January 26, 1990, by Metro-Goldwyn-Mayer. It is also the first MGM film in the 1990s.

Plot
A scheming woman named Emily (Krista Errickson) seeks to kill her husband to collect the insurance money, and is willing to seduce anyone she can to do it – including her husband's brother.

Cast 
Zach Galligan as Todd
Michael Bowen as Berke
Krista Errickson as Emily
Luca Bercovici as Darcy
Sheila Kelley as Adele
David Warner as Doctor Terrence Powers
Cassandra Gava as Cinda
John Denos as Customer in Bar
Alan Shearman as Pandarus
Ron Vernan as Paris
Kathleen Hart as Cafe Waitress

References

External links 
 

1990 films
American crime films
1990s crime films
Metro-Goldwyn-Mayer films
1990s English-language films
1990s American films